Recea-Cristur is a commune in Cluj County, Transylvania, Romania. In Romanian, "recea" refers to a cold place. The commune is composed of nine villages: Căprioara (Kecskeháta), Ciubanca (Alsócsobánka), Ciubăncuța (Felsőcsobánka), Elciu (Völcs), Escu (Veck), Jurca (Gyurkapataka), Osoi (Aszó), Pustuța (Pusztaújfalu) and Recea-Cristur.

History
The first documentary mention of the village of Recea-Cristur dates back to the year 1320.

Demographics 
According to the census from 2002 there was a total population of 1,701 people living in this commune. Of this population, 89.24% are ethnic Romanians,  9.93% ethnic Romani and 0.76% are ethnic Hungarians.

Natives
Cornel Itu

References

Atlasul localităților județului Cluj (Cluj County Localities Atlas), Suncart Publishing House, Cluj-Napoca, 

Communes in Cluj County
Localities in Transylvania